Asian Queer Film Festival (AQFF) is a film festival for LGBT audiences held in Tokyo, Japan. It screens only Asian films. The festival began in 2007 and is held every second year.

2007 
Date 
April 14–20, 2007
Place
Cinema-Arton Shimokitazawa 
Films
Love for Share (2005, Indonesia)
Red Doors (2005, USA)
The Blossoming of Maximo Oliveros (2006, Philippines)

2009 
Date 
September 19–23, 2009
Place
KINEATTIC in Harajuku (Mini Theater) 
Films
Seeds of Summer (2007, Israel)
The World Unseen (2007, South Africa/UK)

2011 
Date 
Date was changed due to 2011 Tōhoku earthquake. (May 20–22 & 27 - 29, 2011)
July 8–10 & 15 - 17, 2011

Place
Cinemart Roppongi
Films
The Panda Candy (2007, China)
The Secrets (2007, Islaer/France)  
Yes or No, So I Love You (2010, Thailand)

See also
 List of LGBT film festivals

References

External links
Asian Queer Film Festival Official Site

Film festivals established in 2007
LGBT culture in Tokyo
LGBT film festivals in Japan
Film festivals in Tokyo
Queer culture
2007 establishments in Japan